Lithuania competed at the 1998 World Aquatics Championships in Perth, Western Australia.

Swimming

2 swimmers represented Lithuania:

Men

References

Nations at the 1998 World Aquatics Championships
1998 in Lithuanian sport
Lithuania at the World Aquatics Championships